Kerry Co-Operative Creameries is an Irish agricultural co-operative society whose primary activity as of 2022 is the holding of investments on behalf of its farmer-members, with its largest investment being in Kerry Group, a publicly traded company which was originally founded by the co-operative but now has a diverse shareholder base.

History 
Kerry Co-op was originally formed through the amalgamation of a number of smaller dairy co-operatives in County Kerry and the purchase of assets of the state-owned Dairy Disposal Board in Kerry. The majority of the co-operatives dairy processing business was transferred to Kerry Group as part of its partial demutualisation with a significant number of shares issued to the co-operative in return.

References 

Companies established in 1974
Kerry Group
Tralee
Cooperatives in the Republic of Ireland